Bartosz Iwan (born April 18, 1984) is a Polish footballer who recently played as a midfielder for Wieczysta Kraków.

Career
In July 2011, he joined Olimpia Elbląg on a one-year contract. In 2019, he joined Wieczysta Kraków. In June 2020, his contract with Wieczysta was dissolved.

Family
He is a son of former Poland international Andrzej Iwan.

References

External links
 
 Bartosz Iwan at Footballdatabase

Polish footballers
Widzew Łódź players
Garbarnia Kraków players
Wisła Kraków players
GKS Katowice players
Odra Wodzisław Śląski players
Piast Gliwice players
Olimpia Elbląg players
Górnik Zabrze players
Ekstraklasa players
I liga players
1984 births
Living people
Footballers from Kraków
Association football midfielders